WHZP (1400 AM) is a broadcast radio station licensed to Veazie, Maine, serving Bangor, Brewer, Old Town, and Orono in Maine.  WHZP is owned and operated by MaineInvests, LLC.

On January 9, 2020, the then-WCYR dropped its classic country format and began simulcasting with WJYE in Gardiner, which itself had begun stunting with a loop of Drake's "Hotline Bling", pending the launch of a new format on January 13. On that day, WCYR and WJYE began a trimulcast with sister station WHTP in Portland, and rebranded as Hot Radio Maine. The stunt came shortly after the sale of WCYR to WJYE's ownership was announced the sale was consummated on January 31, 2020. The call sign was changed to WHZP on March 1, 2020.

References

External links

2005 establishments in Maine
Radio stations established in 2005
HZP
HZP
Rhythmic contemporary radio stations in the United States